Henry Callachan (9 April 1903 – 1990) was a footballer who played in the Scottish Football League for Celtic and in the English Football League for Leicester City. He also played for Wigan Athletic, making 40 appearances in the Cheshire League.

References

External links
 Player profile at FitbaStats

1903 births
1990 deaths
Sportspeople from Chennai
Association football defenders
Scottish footballers
Kirkintilloch Rob Roy F.C. players
Parkhead F.C. players
Celtic F.C. players
Alloa Athletic F.C. players
Beith F.C. players
Leicester City F.C. players
Tunbridge Wells F.C. players
Burton Town F.C. players
Wigan Athletic F.C. players
Scottish Football League players
English Football League players